Play for Tomorrow is a British television anthology science fiction series, produced by the BBC and transmitted on BBC1 in 1982. It spun off from the anthology drama series Play for Today after the success of The Flipside of Dominick Hide on that strand.  Each of the six episodes paints a vision of life in a future year, near the end of the 20th century or at the beginning of the 21st.

Episode list

External links

Section on the strand at the TV Cream website, containing good synopses of most episodes

BBC television dramas
1980s British anthology television series
British science fiction television shows
1982 British television series debuts
1982 British television series endings
1980s British science fiction television series
English-language television shows
Science fiction anthology television series
Television series set in 1997
Television series set in 1999
Television series set in 2002
Television series set in 2016